Jacobus Cornelius Pauw 'Jackie' Snyman (born 14 April 1948) is a former South African rugby union player and coach.

Playing career
A product of Grey College in Bloemfontein, Snyman attended Stellenbosch University for a degree in physical education.  He made his provincial debut for the Free State in 1972 and during September to November 1972, Snyman toured with the Gazelles, a South African under-23 team, to Argentina. Snyman scored 110 points during the tour, the most by a Gazelles player. In 1973, Snyman was a member of the Free State team that played in the Currie Cup final against Northern Transvaal. He scored 14 point for the Free State in their 22–30 loss.

Snyman's test debut for the Springboks was during the 1974 British Lions tour of South Africa in the second test at Loftus Versfeld in Pretoria. He also played in the third and fourth test matches against the Lions and toured with the Springboks to France at the end of 1974. Snyman played three test matches for the Springboks, scoring 18 points.  He also played in four tour matches, scoring eleven points.

Test history

Accolades
In 1972, Snyman was one of the five Young Players of the Year, along with Paul Bayvel, Pikkie du Toit, Dugald MacDonald and Gerald Bosch.

See also
List of South Africa national rugby union players – Springbok no. 466

References

1948 births
Living people
South African rugby union players
South Africa international rugby union players
Free State Cheetahs players
Blue Bulls players
Alumni of Grey College, Bloemfontein
Stellenbosch University alumni
Rugby union centres
Rugby union fly-halves
Rugby union players from Johannesburg